Fossil Coral Reef, also known locally as Bradbury Quarry, is a  abandoned limestone quarry in Le Roy, New York.  It contains a well-preserved Middle Devonian coral reef along with rare tabulate and rugose corals, crinoids, gastropods, and trilobites.

The site was declared a National Natural Landmark in November 1967. It is often used by local paleontology classes.

See also
List of National Natural Landmarks in New York

References

National Natural Landmarks in New York (state)
Geography of Genesee County, New York